In mathematics, the Dirichlet function is the indicator function 1Q or  of the set of rational numbers Q, i.e.  if x is a rational number and  if x is not a rational number (i.e. an irrational number).

It is named after the mathematician Peter Gustav Lejeune Dirichlet. It is an example of pathological function which provides counterexamples to many situations.

Topological properties 
 The Dirichlet function is nowhere continuous.

Its restrictions to the set of rational numbers and to the set of irrational numbers are constants and therefore continuous. The Dirichlet function is an archetypal example of the Blumberg theorem.
 The Dirichlet function can be constructed as the double pointwise limit of a sequence of continuous functions, as follows:

for integer j and k. This shows that the Dirichlet function is a Baire class 2 function. It cannot be a Baire class 1 function because a Baire class 1 function can only be discontinuous on a meagre set.

Periodicity  

For any real number x and any positive rational number T, 1Q(x + T) = 1Q(x). The Dirichlet function is therefore an example of a real periodic function which is not constant but whose set of periods, the set of rational numbers, is a dense subset of R.

Integration properties 
 The Dirichlet function is not Riemann-integrable on any segment of R whereas it is bounded because the set of its discontinuity points is not negligible (for the Lebesgue measure).
 The Dirichlet function provides a counterexample showing that the monotone convergence theorem is not true in the context of the Riemann integral.
  
 The Dirichlet function is Lebesgue-integrable on R and its integral over R is zero because it is zero except on the set of rational numbers which is negligible (for the Lebesgue measure).

See also
 Thomae's function, a variation that is discontinuous only at the rational numbers

References 

Dirichlet
Real analysis